The 2010–11 season was the 51st season in the history of NK Maribor and the club's 20th consecutive season in the Slovenian PrvaLiga since the league's establishment in 1991. The team participated in the Slovenian PrvaLiga, Slovenian Football Cup, and UEFA Europa League. The season covers the period from 1 June 2010 to 31 May 2011. The club started and finished the season with Darko Milanič as head coach and were crowned the league champions for the ninth time. They were also runners-up of the Slovenian cup and supercup.

The club began their league campaign with a total of 37 points in their first 15 matches, during which time they were undefeated. This set the new all-time league record for the best start of the season, previously held by Domžale (35 points).

Season review
The team played its opening match of the season in a Supercup final on 9 July 2010, when they lost against Koper after penalties (5–4). The score after regulation was 0–0. Maribor qualified for the final as a Slovenian Cup winner of the previous season. Traditionally, the Supercup final was played at a home stadium of the Slovenian champions, however, in this season it was played in Maribor, due to the construction of a new stadium in Koper at the time.

During their Europa League campaign, the club had a solid run and played a total of six matches in the competition. Their record was four wins, one draw and one defeat in matches against Videoton, Hibernian and Palermo. The team did particularly well on home field at the Ljudski vrt stadium as they recorded three wins in three matches with a goal difference of 9–2. However, that was not enough for progression as their only defeat came in the first leg of the play-off round against Palermo (3–0). In the second leg Maribor was winning against the Italian side 2–0 after 60 minutes of play, however, the match eventually finished with a 3–2 home victory which was not enough to progress into the main stage of the competition. After the match it was announced that Palermo had acquired Josip Iličić and Armin Bačinović, two of the top players during the club's Europa league campaign.

The club did extremely well during the 2010–11 PrvaLiga season as the team was in the league's top position after every round of the season, except after week two when they were second. Maribor was undefeated in the league up until the 21st round in March 2011, when they were defeated at home, by Gorica (3–1). Before that the team's score in the first 20 rounds was 14 wins and six draws. Eventually the team won their ninth league title with 75 points, eight more than second placed Domžale. Marcos Tavares, team captain, was the league's best scorer with 16 goals. In addition he was the club's best scorer during the season with 21 goals in all competitions. Tavares was also voted as the best player of the season by the players, the media and the fans.
He scored one goal in the 2010–11 Cup season where the team reached the final that was played in late May 2011, at Stožice Stadium in Ljubljana against Domžale. In a spectacular match, which ended with the score of 4–3 after 90 minutes, Domžale prevailed and won their first ever Slovenian cup title. With the 2010–11 Slovenian league title, the club has won its 16th major title in its 20th season in Slovenian football.

Supercup

Slovenian League

Standings

Results summary

Results by round

Matches

Slovenian Cup

UEFA Europa League

Second qualifying round

Third qualifying round

Play-off round

Squad statistics

Key

Players
No.     = Shirt number
Pos.    = Playing position
GK      = Goalkeeper
DF      = Defender
MF      = Midfielder
FW      = Forward

Nationality
 = Brazil
 = Croatia
 = Slovenia

Competitions
Apps    = Appearances
 = Yellow card
 = Red card

Appearances and goals
Correct as of 29 May 2011, end of the 2010–11 season. Flags indicate national team as has been defined under FIFA eligibility rules. Players may hold more than one non-FIFA nationality. The players squad numbers, playing positions, nationalities and statistics are based solely on match reports in Matches sections above and the official website of NK Maribor and the Slovenian PrvaLiga. Player in bold received the Purple Warrior trophy as the club's most valuable player, selected by the fans. Only the players, which made at least one appearance for the first team, are listed.

Discipline
Correct as of 29 May 2011, end of the 2010–11 season. Flags indicate national team as has been defined under FIFA eligibility rules. Players may hold more than one non-FIFA nationality. The players squad numbers, playing positions, nationalities and statistics are based solely on match reports in Matches sections above and the official website of NK Maribor and the Slovenian PrvaLiga. If a player received two yellow cards in a match and was subsequently sent off the numbers count as two yellow cards, one red card. Player in bold received the Purple Warrior trophy as the club's most valuable player, selected by the fans. Only the players, which received at least one yellow or red card, are listed.

Transfers and loans

Summer transfer window

Winter transfer window

Footnotes
Knockout matches which were decided on penalty kicks are listed as a draw.
 Traditionally, the Slovenian Supercup is played at the stadium of the previous year league champions. FC Koper has won the 2009–10 Slovenian PrvaLiga, however, their Bonifika Stadium was closed at the time of the match due to redevelopment, and the 2010 final was played at the Ljudski vrt stadium in Maribor, the home of NK Maribor. Thus, the match is listed as being played at home.

See also
List of NK Maribor seasons

References

NK Maribor seasons
Maribor